The 2015 NCAA Division II baseball tournament decided the baseball champion of the NCAA Division II level for the 2014 season. The Screaming Eagles of the University of Southern Indiana won their second national championship as led by head coach Tracy Archuleta. The Screaming Eagles defeated the Mavericks of Colorado Mesa University in the national championship. Southern Indiana pitcher Matt Chavarria was named most outstanding player of the tournament.

Regionals

Atlantic Region–West Lawn, PA
Hosted by Kutztown at Owls Field

Central Region–Russellville, AR
Hosted by Arkansas Tech at Tech Field

East Region–Manchester, NH
Hosted by Southern New Hampshire at Penmen Field

Midwest Region–Evansville, IN
Hosted by Southern Indiana at USI Baseball Field

South Region–Tampa, FL
Hosted by Tampa at University of Tampa Baseball Field

South Central Region–Grand Junction, CO
Hosted by Colorado Mesa at Suplizio Field

Southeast Region–Greenwood, SC
Hosted by Lander at Dolney Stadium

West Region–San Diego, CA

Hosted by UC San Diego at Triton Ballpark

College World Series

Participants

Results

Bracket
Hosted by University of Mount Olive and Town of Cary at USA Baseball National Training Complex

Game results

References

NCAA Division II Baseball Tournament
NCAA Division II baseball tournament